Club Deportivo Brea is a Spanish football team based in Brea de Aragón in the community of Aragón. Founded in 1971, the club plays in the Segunda División RFEF – Group 2.

Season to season

2 seasons in Segunda División RFEF
8 seasons in Tercera División

References

External links
Profile at futbolaragon.com  
Season history at FRE 

Football clubs in Aragon
Association football clubs established in 1971
Divisiones Regionales de Fútbol clubs
1971 establishments in Spain